Sidney Smith may refer to:

 Sydney Smith (1771–1845), English writer and clergyman
 Sidney Smith (Royal Navy officer) (1764–1840) British naval officer

 Syd Smith (baseball) (1883–1961), American baseball player and college football coach
 Sidney Smith (Assyriologist) (1889–1979), institute director and academic
 Sidney Smith (cartoonist) (1877–1935), American cartoonist
 Sidney Smith (cricketer) (1929–1985), English cricketer
 Sidney Smith (lawyer) (1823–1889), lawyer and politician in Upper Canada
 Sidney Smith (rugby league), rugby league footballer of 1920s and 1930s
 Sidney Smith (snooker player) (1908–1990), English billiards and snooker player
 Sidney Earle Smith (1897–1959), Canadian university president and Secretary of State for External Affairs
 Sidney Irving Smith (1843–1926), American zoologist
 Sidney Lawton Smith (1845–1929), American designer, illustrator and bookplate artist
 Sidney Maynard Smith (1875–1928), British surgeon and freemason
 Sidney Oslin Smith Jr. (1923–2012), United States federal judge
 Sidney R. J. Smith (1858–1913), English architect
 Sidney Walter Smith (1893–1981), New Zealand politician
 Sid Smith (actor) (1894–1928), American actor in silent films

See also
Sid Smith (disambiguation)
Sydney Smith (disambiguation)